The 2007 Nigerian Senate election in Kwara State was held on April 21, 2007, to elect members of the Nigerian Senate to represent Kwara State. Simon Ajibola representing Kwara South, Gbemisola Ruqayyah Saraki representing Kwara Central and Ahmed Mohammed Inuwa representing Kwara North all won on the platform of the Peoples Democratic Party.

Overview

Summary

Results

Kwara South 
The election was won by Simon Ajibola of the Peoples Democratic Party.

Kwara Central 
The election was won by Gbemisola Ruqayyah Saraki of the Peoples Democratic Party.

Kwara North 
The election was won by Ahmed Mohammed Inuwa of the Peoples Democratic Party.

References 

April 2007 events in Nigeria
Kwara State Senate elections
Kwa